The timeline of the Casey Anthony case chronicles the events surrounding the death of Caylee Marie Anthony and the trial of her mother, Casey Anthony.

2008
June 9, 2008 – Casey Anthony and her daughter, Caylee, move out of Casey's parents' - Cindy and George Anthony - home, and in with her ex-boyfriend, Ricardo Morales, and friend, Amy Huizenga.

June 15, 2008 – Caylee is videotaped visiting an assisted living facility with grandmother Cindy Anthony that morning, who is visiting her father. Cindy swims with Caylee in the Anthonys' pool later that day, afterwards removing the ladder and closing the gate.

June 16, 2008 – Caylee is last seen alive at the Anthony family residence. According to the defense, Caylee drowned in the family's above-ground swimming pool sometime during this day and both Casey and George Anthony panicked upon finding the body and covered up her death. The timeline of that day follows:

 7:00 a.m. Cindy Anthony testified that she left for work a few minutes before 7:00 a.m. while everyone in the home was still asleep.
 7:52 a.m. Activity from Casey Anthony's password-protected account on MySpace and research for "shot girls" costumes for Tony Lazarro's night club events.
 7:56 a.m. Casey's AIM account was used to chat on the computer.
 12:50 p.m. According to George Anthony, Caylee departed with Casey by car around 12:50 p.m. with backpacks on their shoulders. (Note: Although George testified that Casey and Caylee left the house at 12:50, there is further computer activity on the home computer associated with Casey's account and her cell phone pings do not leave the area of the Anthony family home until 4:11 pm.)
 1:39 p.m. Activity associated with Casey's AIM, MySpace, and Facebook accounts at 1:39 p.m. on the home computer. The last browser activity during that session is at 1:42 p.m.
 1:44 p.m. Casey calls friend Amy Huizenga.
 2:21 p.m. Call with Amy Huizenga ends.
 2:30 p.m. George Anthony testified that he left the home at this time to go to work.
 2:49 p.m. Casey Anthony's cellphone connects with a tower nearest to the home, and the Anthony family's desktop computer is activated by someone using a password-protected account Casey Anthony used.
 2:51 p.m. A Google search is made for the term "fool-proof suffocation," misspelling the last word as "suffication". The user clicks on an article criticizing pro-suicide websites that promote "foolproof" ways to die.
 2:52 p.m. Activity on MySpace.
 2:52 p.m. Casey answers phone call from Jesse Grund. He describes this conversation as "abnormal", where Casey stated to him that her parents were divorcing and she had to find a new place to live.
 3:04 p.m. Casey disconnected the phone call from Jesse Grund to take an incoming call from George Anthony. According to the defense, the 26-second call from her father took place as soon as he got to work to tell her "I took care of everything," telling her he disposed of the body and warning her not to tell her mother about the child's death.
 3:34 p.m. Casey made a phone call to her boyfriend, Tony Lazarro. Unanswered.
 Between 4:10 and 4:14 p.m. Casey made six unanswered phone calls to her mother.
 4:11 p.m. Casey's cellphone pings indicate it was at or near the house until she headed toward Lazzaro's apartment at 4:11 p.m.
 7:54 p.m. She and Lazzaro are seen entering and walking around casually at a Blockbuster video store. Caylee is not with them.

June 17, 2008 – George and Cindy Anthony notice that the gate to the swimming pool is open and the ladder is next to the pool.

June 18 or 19, 2008 – At 1:30 p.m. Casey Anthony approached neighbor Brian Burner and asked if she could borrow a shovel, she needed to dig up a bamboo root she had been tripping over. Gave shovel, she took it in garage, where her car was backed in, he took shower, and Casey Anthony returned shovel around 2:30. 

June 20, 2008 – Casey Anthony is captured in various photos partying at the Fusion nightclub and participating in a "hot body contest".

June 23, 2008 – Anthony Lazzaro testified that he helped Casey break into the shed at her parents' home to take gas cans for Casey's car, which had run out of gas. Lazarro said he watched Casey open the trunk of her car. Although he did not see the inside of the trunk, he said there was no odor that he could detect.

June 24, 2008 – George Anthony called police to report the break-in and report the gas cans missing. Later this day, he saw Casey at the Anthony residence and confronted her about taking them. George said that when he went to get them out of his daughter's car, she ran past him, quickly opened the trunk and retrieved the gas cans herself, yelling, "Here's your fucking gas cans!" George testified that he smelled gasoline in the car, but did not detect any other odors.

June 30, 2008 – Casey's car is towed from a parking lot after being there for several days; her purse and a child's car seat are found in the car's back seat.

July 2, 2008 – Casey gets a tattoo on her back saying "Bella Vita" which means "beautiful life" in Italian.

July 15, 2008 – George and Cindy Anthony pick up Casey's car from the impound yard. George Anthony observes a strong odor emanating from the vehicle. An inspection of the car trunk reveals a plastic bag containing trash. Distressed because Casey has not brought Caylee home in a month, Cindy tracks down and meets with Amy Huizenga who takes Cindy to the apartment where Casey is staying and makes Casey come home. Casey tells her parents that she hasn't seen Caylee in a month and that a babysitter named Zenaida Fernandez Gonzalez ("Zanny") may have kidnapped her. Cindy Anthony immediately calls 911 and reports her granddaughter Caylee missing.

July 16, 2008 – Police investigators discover Casey Anthony has been lying about her place of employment and where she says her nanny lives. As a result, Casey is arrested and charged with child neglect, making false official statements, and obstructing an investigation.

July 17, 2008 – Casey appears in court, during which time the judge denies bail, saying she showed a "woeful disregard for the welfare of her child." The policemen from the Sheriff's Office search Casey's car and takes several items of evidence.

July 18, 2008 – Casey Anthony hires Jose Baez as her legal attorney, who writes a letter to Orange County Sheriff's Office about Casey's willingness to cooperate with law enforcement.

July 22, 2008 – Because of police testimony about allegedly incriminating evidence from the car, Circuit Court Judge Stan Strickland sets Casey Anthony's bail at $500,000.

July 29, 2008 – Judge denies defense motion to ban the release to the media all jailhouse recordings, 911 tapes and visitor logs. Florida public records law mandates record requests by media be honored promptly. Over the next three years thousands of pages of audio, video, forensic information and legal documents detailing the criminal investigations will be released.

August 5, 2008 – The State Attorney's Office files formal charges against Casey Anthony for one felony count of child neglect.

August 8, 2008 – WFTV reports that investigators suspect Caylee may have drowned in the family swimming pool on June 16.

August 11, 12, 13 – Meter reader Roy Kronk reports suspicious bag to police. A police officer meets Kronk at the scene and Kronk tells him he had seen a skull and bones in a bag. However, the officer was rude and conducted only a cursory search.

August 21, 2008 – After bail bondsman Leonard Padilla pays Casey Anthony's $500,000 bail she is fitted with an electronic monitoring device and released.

August 29, 2008 – Casey Anthony is arrested again on charges of writing four checks worth nearly $650 on Amy Huizenga's checking account without permission. Orange County police said the charges are "unrelated to the investigation." Prosecutors offer Casey a limited immunity deal related to "the false statements given to law enforcement about locating her child." She refuses it soon after. (The offer is renewed on August 25 and again refused.)

September 5, 2008 – Casey Anthony's parents post a $500,000 bond and she is released from county jail into their custody after being fitted with an electronic tracking device.

September 6, 2008 – Deputies seize a handgun from the trunk of George Anthony's car because having a gun on the property violates Casey's bail. George says he planned to use it to force Casey's friends to tell him what happened to Caylee.

September 10, 2008 – The whole family allegedly refuses to take a lie detector test offered by both the FBI and local authorities.

September 15–16, 2008 – Casey Anthony turns herself in on new check fraud charges, fraudulent use of identification, and petty theft. She is released the next day on $1,250 bond, and again fitted with an electronic tracking device.

September 25, 2008 – Zenaida Fernandez-Gonzalez, the woman Casey Anthony reportedly named as an alleged baby sitter and suspect in the case, files a defamation lawsuit against her.

October 14, 2008 – Casey Anthony is indicted by a grand jury on charges of first degree murder, aggravated child abuse, aggravated manslaughter of a child, and four counts of providing false information to police. She is arrested later that day. Judge John Jordan orders that she be held without bond. Because it is a capital crime, Casey Anthony faces possible death penalty.

October 21, 2008 – Charges of child neglect are dropped against Casey Anthony on assumption the child is dead. On October 28 Casey Anthony is arraigned and pleads not guilty to all charges.

November 8–9, 2008 – Texas EquuSearch leads hundreds of volunteers in a search of a grid for Caylee, but when nothing is found they suspend their search.

November 15, 2008 – The Anthony family's private investigator, Dominic Casey, searches the area where Caylee's remains later are found. The search is videotaped. The family's attorney denies asking Dominic Casey to search there. The defense questioned who sent him to the area; he said that a psychic gave him the tip. According to the prosecution, the area was under several inches of water at the time.

December 5, 2008 – The state initially says it will not seek the death penalty against Casey Anthony.

December 11, 2008 – After yet a fourth tip from Roy Kronk, skeletal remains of what appeared to be a small child are found one-quarter mile from the Anthony home. Orange County Sheriff's Office obtains warrant and searches Anthony residence.

December 19, 2008 – Police announce DNA testing confirms that the remains belong to Caylee Anthony.

2009 

January 23, 2009 – Police discover George Anthony, who had been text messaging family members, despondent and possibly under the influence of alcohol and medication in a hotel room. Police also discovered a lengthy suicide note.

January 29, 2009 – Judge Stan Strickland orders Casey Anthony to appear at all court hearings in her case.

April 14, 2009 – The State of Florida reverses self and will seek the imposition of the death penalty.

September 17, 2009 – Casey Anthony's defense team files a motion to dismiss the murder charges against her because the state allegedly failed to preserve evidence in the case. The motion is denied.

November 24, 2009 – Defense attorneys accuse Texas EquuSearch's Tim Miller of lying to the court in their claim that only 32 people searched in the area where Caylee's remains were eventually found and that the number was much higher.

December 18, 2009 – Judge Stan Strickland denies a request to take the death penalty off the table in the prosecution of Casey Anthony.

2010 

January 26, 2010 – Casey pleads guilty for 13 fraudulent check charges, takes responsibility for her actions, and makes full restitution. The judge sentences her to time served.

April 19, 2010 – Judge Stan Strickland steps down after Casey Anthony's defense team files a motion accusing him of having inappropriate conversations with a writer, Dave Knechel, who blogged about the case. Strickland granted the motion because the accusation would "generate renewed allegations of bias". Judge Belvin Perry, Jr. is appointed to take over the case.

May 11, 2010 – Judge Perry will allow the state to seek the death penalty.

August 14, 2010 – Cindy Anthony appears as a guest on the "Today" Show where she calls Casey a victim, and also claims she's not involved with what happened to Caylee's remains.

August 16, 2010 – George and Cindy Anthony's attorney, Brad Conway, steps down because he disputes a Jose Baez motion claiming Conway was given unrestricted access to documents belonging to Texas EquuSearch to which he was not given the same access.

2011 

January 4, 2011 – Judge Belvin Perry postpones ruling on over two dozen defense motions to exclude evidence from the trial. Over the next several months Perry rules for or against these various motions to exclude evidence. He admonishes, and later financially sanctions, defense attorney Jose Baez for failing to turn over expert witness discovery information to prosecutors before a certain deadline.

April 1, 2011 – After numerous outbursts by lawyers in court over what is and is not scientific evidence, Judge Perry ruled more such behavior would result in a fine of $100 per outburst, with the proceeds to go to the United Way.

May 20, 2011 – After eleven days of jury selection, Judge Perry swears in a jury of five men and seven women, plus three men and two women as alternate jurors.

May 24, 2011 – Trial begins in Orlando, Florida. The prosecution states Casey Anthony used duct tape to suffocate Caylee Anthony. The defense contends the child actually drowned in her grandparents' swimming pool, that Casey's father George Anthony warned Casey she would be imprisoned for life for child neglect and then covered up the death; thus she failed to report the incident for 31 days. Also, because George Anthony had sexually molested Casey as a child she had a habit of hiding her pain and lying. Baez admits Casey had fabricated the story of the nanny named Zenaida Fernandez-Gonzales. Baez also questions whether Roy Kronk, who found the remains, actually removed them from elsewhere and questioned police motivations for pursuing a murder investigation. Prosecutors call George Anthony as their first witness and he denies to them having ever sexually abused his daughter Casey or covering up the death of Caylee.

May 25, 2011 – The prosecution calls various friends of Casey Anthony who testify about her fabricated stories during June and July 2008 of having a job and employing a nanny for Caylee. A neighbor testifies that in mid-June 2008 Casey and a boyfriend borrowed a shovel from him to dig up a bamboo root.

May 26, 2011 – Former boyfriend testifies Casey told him her brother, Lee Anthony, sexually groped her. George Anthony is called back to the witness stand where he says that he did not smell decomposition in Casey's car on June 24, 2008 and states he put duct tape over a hole in one of the plastic gas cans she had returned to him.
		
May 27, 2011 – A tow truck company manager and George Anthony testify that from their experience the smell from Casey's car resembled human decomposition. During cross-examination, George Anthony tells Jose Baez that he did not sexually abuse Casey.

May 28, 2011 – Former boyfriend testifies about Casey's normal behavior on June 16, 2008. Cindy Anthony testifies that they swam that day and that Caylee could get up the ladder into the pool. She also believed Casey worked at Universal Studios Orlando Resort and had a babysitter named Zanny.

May 31, 2011 – Cindy Anthony says her description of Casey's car smelling "like someone died" was just a "figure of speech." She tried to get rid of the smell by spraying Febreze household odor eliminator. She says she found the pool ladder in the pool the evening of June 16. Casey's friend Amy Huizenga talks of Casey's frustration about getting help with Caylee and reveals that on June 27, Casey texted her about a dead animal on the frame of the car.

June 1, 2011 – The first officers to arrive at the Anthony home on July 16, 2008 testify that they did not smell human decomposition in Casey's car and admit they did not search the other two family cars. They also testify about Casey going to Universal Orlando Resort with Casey that day, where she confessed she no longer worked there and did not have a nanny named Zenaida Fernandez-Gonzalez.

June 2, 2011 – Video tapes are shown of Casey lying to her parents in jail and denying to an officer on July 16, 2008 that Caylee had drowned in the pool, as he suggested.

June 3, 2011 – Investigators describe evidence collection from Casey's car and obtaining from the towing yard the plastic garbage bag that had been in it. One investigator states he smelled human decomposition.
 
June 4, 2011 – An FBI forensic scientist testifies the single hair removed from the car trunk was similar to a hair from Caylee's hair brush and had "root-banding" consistent with that from a decomposing body.

June 6, 2011 – Dr. Arpad Vass of the Oak Ridge National Laboratory describes using a gas chromatograph mass spectrometer to find signs of human decomposition and a high level of chloroform in the trunk of Casey's car. The defense challenges Vass' financial motivation and the chain of evidence.

June 7, 2011 – FBI forensic chemist confirms chloroform residue in trunk of Casey's car, but also states that household cleaning products leave traces of chloroform. A dog handler describes dog alerting to human decomposition in the trunk, as well as Caylee's playhouse.

June 8, 2011 – Second dog handler says his dog smelled decomposition in back yard. Computer analysts confirm a search for "chloroform" on Casey's computer March 17, 2008 and "how to make chloroform" on March 21, 2008.

June 9, 2011 – Software analyst John Bradley states someone used the Anthony computer to search the website Sci-spot.com for "chloroform" 84 times on March 21, 2008. During cross-examination, he admits that automatic page reloading could account for that number and there was no way of knowing who performed the searches. Investigators show photographs of the remains, including of duct tape that appears to be over the mouth area. One admits that duct tape might not originally have been on the mouth and could have shifted position as he collected remains. Casey Anthony becomes ill looking at the photographs and the jury is dismissed for the day.

June 10, 2011 – Medical examiner states that the death is ruled a homicide because of the delay in reporting the disappearance, the fact the body was hidden, and the existence of duct tape, but states under cross-examination she did not know how the child died. Crime scene investigators describe similar maggots found in the car trunk and at the crime scene.

June 11, 2011 – An expert in forensic entomology states he found flies related to decomposition in the trunk of Casey's car. Orange County, Florida crime scene investigators identify a piece of Henkel brand duct tape found at the scene and testify it is the same brand as George Anthony put on the red gas can. One states that no Henkel brand tape was found elsewhere in the Anthonys' home.

June 13, 2011 – FBI examiner states a hair from the child's skull is consistent with but not identical to the single hair found in the trunk. FBI agent could not find any fingerprints on duct tape found near the remains but initially did find adhesive in the shape of a heart on a corner of a piece of duct tape; later she could not find it again.

June 14, 2011 – FBI quality assurance specialist says the hair found in trunk could have come from any member of the Anthony family. A crime scene investigator says heart shaped stickers were found in Casey's room but did not link them to the one alleged to be on the duct tape. Testimony about and photo of Casey's "Bella Vita" tattoo made on July 2, 2008.

June 15, 2011 – Prosecution rests its case. Defense makes a motion to acquit based on insufficient evidence a murder was committed, which the judge denies based on previous case rulings.

June 16, 2011 – Defense begins its case, often recalling state witnesses for further testimony. Crime scene investigator says no blood was found in Casey's car or incriminating stains on her clothes. FBI analyst states no DNA evidence was found in the car or at the crime scene. She states FBI did a paternity test that showed Lee Anthony was not Caylee's father. Crime scene investigator and forensics supervisor state a heart-shaped sticker was found far from the body. An FBI forensic document examiner found no evidence of a heart shaped sticker on the duct tape found near the remains.
 
June 17, 2011 – Forensic entomologist called by the defense states if there was a body in the trunk, there should have been hundreds or even thousands of blow flies trapped in the trunk as well.

June 18, 2011 – Defense calls a new witness, Dr. Werner Spitz, who questions the medical examiner's autopsy, including the failure to open the skull, and says there was no indication the death was a homicide. He believes the duct tape was placed on the skull after decomposition and that the crime scene photos of the position of the hair on the skull were staged, possibly by the medical examiner.

June 21, 2011 – A defense-called forensic botanist challenges the prosecution's theory of when the body was placed at the crime scene. An expert in analytical chemistry who works with Dr. Vass challenges the process of testing for the presence of chloroform.

June 22, 2011 – An FBI forensic examiner says no dirt from the crime scene was found on shoes at the Anthony home or a neighbor's borrowed shovel. FBI forensic toxicologist found no toxins in the hair from Caylee Anthony's skull. A scientist who worked with Dr. Vass who testifies tests did not conclusively prove there was a body in the trunk. The FBI's forensic chemist examiner could not find traces of chloroform in the car. The FBI forensics expert found no hair in the trunk liner showing signs of decomposition. She also testified the duct tape at the crime scene was dissimilar to that in the Anthony home.

June 23, 2011 – An FBI hair and fiber expert says only one hair from the car trunk had a sign of decomposition. There is a long debate among prosecutors and defense over the reliability of "root banding." An expert in forensic toxicology testifies Dr. Vass's test "lacked organization and planning" and had "minimal standards of quality control." He also mentions that chloroform is a byproduct of chlorinated swimming pool water.

June 24, 2011 – Cindy Anthony is recalled to the stand where the defense shows her a photograph of Caylee on the pool ladder and she again mentions the ladder was in the pool on June 16 when she returned home from work that evening, adding that she called George to ask about it since she took out the ladder from the pool on the previous day after swimming there with Caylee. The defense also showed the jury a picture of Caylee appearing to open a sliding-glass door at her home. Cindy says Caylee was capable of opening the sliding door to the back yard and the pool.
Lee Anthony states he was not told Casey was pregnant until days before Caylee's birth. Search volunteer testifies about duct tape being used at search headquarters.

June 25, 2011 – Judge Belvin Perry, Jr. temporarily halts proceedings after defense motion to determine if Anthony was competent to proceed with trial, based on a privileged communication from Casey Anthony.

June 27, 2011 – Casey Anthony is found competent to continue after psychological evaluation. June 27 also is the date the prosecution states it discussed with defense attorney Jose Baez software analyst John Bradley's post-testimony admission to prosecutors that there was only one search for chloroform, not 84. In testimony, the lead detective admits cadaver dogs had not searched inside the Anthonys' home, or in two other Anthony cars. A professor of chemistry called by the defense says there is no scientifically valid instrument that can identify decomposition, that there is no consensus on what chemicals are typical of human decomposition and that chemical compounds identified by Dr. Vass in air samples can be found in household products and garbage. Three witnesses discuss the November 2008 videotaped search by Anthony family private investigators in the woods where Caylee's body later was found.

June 28, 2011 – A Texas EquuSearch team letter discusses their November search for Caylee of the site where the body later was found. George Anthony denies he had an affair with Krystal Holloway, borrowed money from her, or told her Caylee's death was "an accident that snowballed out of control." He admits going to her home and sending her a text message. He testifies he bought a gun to threaten Casey's friends into telling him where Caylee was, even though he knew having one violated Casey's bail. Cindy Anthony denies she sent private investigators to search the site where Caylee's body later was found; her son Lee Anthony and the case's lead detective then testify she did so, after talking to a psychic. Roy Kronk testifies about his calls to police and finding the body. He denies he told his son finding the body would make him rich and famous, but admits he did receive $5,000 after Caylee's remains were identified. Judge Perry does not allow jury to hear Casey's ex-fiancée say that Casey told him Lee had once tried to grope her while she was sleeping.

June 29, 2011 – Cindy Anthony says Casey's response to the media theory that Caylee drowned was "Surprise. Surprise." Baez asks George Anthony about his suicide attempt in January 2009 and the next day the judge allows the jury to see the suicide note. Roy Kronk's son states that Kronk did say that finding Caylee Anthony would make him rich and famous. Kronk testifies about why he changed his story about lifting the skull. An expert on grief and trauma testifies that pretending nothing had happened and partying was one of many different ways people, especially young people, express grief.
					
June 30, 2011 – Casey Anthony tells Judge Perry she does not want to testify. Perry will not allow the jury to sniff air samples from the car trunk. Defense calls search volunteer Krystal Holloway who states that she had an affair with George Anthony. She states that George Anthony told her that Caylee's death was "an accident that snowballed out of control." Under cross-examination, she also agreed with her earlier statement to police in which she said George Anthony did not say he knew it was an accident. After Holloway steps down, Judge Perry tells jurors that her testimony could be used to impeach George Anthony's credibility, but that is not the proof of how Caylee died. George, Cindy and Lee Anthony all testify that their pets had been buried in the back yard. Cindy calls it a "tradition" to wrap them in blankets and a plastic bag; duct tape was used to keep the plastic bags from opening. After this final witness, the defense rests. The prosecutor rebuttal begins with showing the jury photographs of Caylee's clothes and George's suicide note.

July 1, 2011 – The prosecution continues rebuttal with two representatives of Cindy Anthony's former employer explaining why their computer login system shows Cindy was at work the afternoon she said she went home early and searched her computer for information about chloroform. A police computer analyst says someone had purposely searched online for "neck + breaking." Another analyst testifies she did not find evidence that Cindy Anthony had searched certain terms she claimed to have searched. An anthropology professor is recalled to rebut a defense witness on the need to open a skull during an autopsy. The lead detective states that there were no phone calls between Cindy and George Anthony during the week of June 16, 2008, but admits he did not know that George had a second cell phone.

July 3, 2011 – Judge Perry rules that during closing arguments the defense could argue there was a drowning involved in the death of Caylee because there was sufficient evidence of that, but could not argue George had sexually abused Casey. Prosecution does an hour and a half of closing arguments, offering a timeline of events and asserting that Casey intentionally suffocated Caylee to death by putting three pieces of duct tape place over her face. The alleged motive was that the child interfered with her partying lifestyle and spending time with her boyfriend. The prosecution states the defense' story that Caylee drowned and George encouraged Casey to cover up the accident made no sense. The defense counters with four hours of arguments insisting there was no proof of how Caylee died, challenging the prosecutors' most important evidence as "fantasy," and emphasizing the reasonable doubt that Casey killed Caylee. It again insists that after the child drowned, Casey panicked and George Anthony made the death look like a murder and that he was the one who put the body in the nearby woods.

July 4, 2011 – Prosecutors Jeff Ashton and Linda Drane Burdick present a rebuttal to the defense closing, telling jurors their forensic evidence had proved their case, while the defense made claims they did not prove. The case then goes to the jury. Judge Belvin Perry, Jr. issues final instructions to the jury.

July 5, 2011 – After about ten hours of deliberation, the jury acquits Casey Anthony of all felony charges (i.e., of first-degree murder, aggravated manslaughter, and aggravated child abuse), but convicts her of all four misdemeanor charges of giving false information to a law enforcement officer.

July 7, 2011 – Judge Perry sentences Casey Anthony to one year in county jail and $1,000 in fines for each of the four misdemeanor counts of providing false information to a law enforcement officer. The judge orders all sentences to run consecutive to each other, with credit for time served. Based on three years credit for time served plus additional credit for good behavior, her release date is set for July 17, 2011. Judge Perry announces he will not release the juror's names for seven days saying some people "disagree with their verdict" and "would like to take something out on them."

July 13, 2011 – Texas EquuSearch, which assisted in the search for Caylee, sues Casey Anthony for the costs of the search.

July 15, 2011 – Casey Anthony appeals convictions of providing false information to a law enforcement officer.

July 17, 2011 – Casey Anthony is released from jail at 12:10 AM, with $537.68 in cash.

July 19, 2011 – Prosecutors write a letter responding to a New York Times article about alleged withholding of exculpatory evidence about the chloroform searches and says they were about to give the jury a Notice of Supplemental Discovery but did not do so because jurors had reached a verdict.

July 26, 2011 – Judge Belvin Perry, Jr. rules juror names will remain secret until October 2011, citing public "outrage and distress" over the not guilty verdict. He also appeals to Florida legislators to bar the release of juror's names in some cases "in order to protect the safety and well-being of those citizens willing to serve."

August 1, 2011 – Orange County, Florida Circuit Judge Stan Strickland signs amended court documents that order Casey Anthony to return to Orlando within 72 hours to serve one year of supervised probation for the check fraud charge that Anthony pleaded guilty to in January 2010. Jose Baez accuses Strickland of bias in the ruling. Strickland recuses himself from the case.

August 5, 2011 – Baez obtains an emergency hearing with Judge Perry arguing Anthony already had served her probation and that Strickland no longer had jurisdiction over her. Perry postpones a decision calling the situation "a maze."

August 10, 2011 – The Florida Department of Children and Families releases report concluding that Casey Anthony failed to protect Caylee, and that Casey's actions or lack of actions resulted in the death of the child. The finding has little legal relevance.

August 12, 2011 – Judge Belvin Perry upholds Judge Strickland's order, ruling that Casey Anthony must return to Orlando to serve one year's probation for check fraud, reporting no later than noon on August 26. The judge declares that her residential information during the probation period may be kept confidential because of threats made against her life.

August 23, 2011 – After defense attorneys file motion to appeal Judge Perry's probation ruling, the Florida Fifth District Court of Appeals upholds it. Casey Anthony reports for probation at a secret location on August 24.

September 15, 2011 – Judge Belvin Perry rules Casey Anthony must pay $97,000 of the $517,000 the state of Florida wanted her to pay for investigative and prosecution costs to the state under a provision of Florida sentencing law. He ruled she only had to pay those costs directly related to lying to law enforcement about the death of Caylee, i.e., search costs up to September 30, 2008, when the Sheriff's Office stopped investigating a missing-child case. In earlier arguments Attorney Cheney Mason had called the prosecutors' attempts to exact the larger sum "sour grapes" because the prosecution lost its case. He told reporters that Anthony is indigent.

September 23, 2011 – Judge Belvin Perry rules Casey Anthony must pay an additional $119,000 for the recalculated costs of the sheriff's search for Caylee Anthony, for a total of $217,000.

October 8, 2011 – Casey Anthony answers a few questions and takes the Fifth Amendment repeatedly in a video deposition regarding the Zenaida Fernandez-Gonzales lawsuit.

October 25, 2011 – Judge Perry releases names of jurors in Casey Anthony trial.

2012 

February 15, 2012 – Casey's first monthly court payment of $20 is due.

June 11, 2012 – Casey motions for a new trial to have convictions of counts of lying to police overturned.

November 20, 2012 – WKMG-TV television in Orlando reported that police never investigated Firefox browser information on Casey Anthony's computer the day of Caylee's death; they only looked at Internet Explorer evidence. The station learned about this information from Casey Anthony's attorney Jose Baez who mentioned it in his book on the case.

References

External links
 Casey Anthony's Attorney is running for Broward County Judge in Florida
 Attorney Johnathan Kasen defended Casey Anthony

2000s in Florida
2010s in Florida
Contemporary history timelines
Personal timelines
Women in Florida